The Tongue Rocks are a small set of ice-free volcanic rocks lying between Eagle Island and Beak Island, off Trinity Peninsula, Antarctica. They are part of the James Ross Island Volcanic Group and were named by United Kingdom Antarctic Place-Names Committee (UK-APC) in association with Eagle and Beak Islands.

References

Rock formations of the Trinity Peninsula